Kapil Muni Tiwary (1932-2021) was a professor and head of the department of Linguistics and Literature at Patna University and a professor of English in Yemen.

He published many articles in Yemen Times Newspaper during the period 2000/2004. His articles were about Indian loan words into Arabic and vice versa.

He encouraged Yemeni rising writers from among his students in Taiz University, and  introduced their books, like Poet Mohammad Noaman Al-Hakimi (his book title is Bilquis Basil). In His introductions to Bilquis Basil Collection of poem by Mohammad Noaman Al-Hakimi, Dr. Tiwary says: 
W. B. Yeats, the famous Anglo-Irish poet , is reported to have said that if you quarrel with the world, you do politics, but if you quarrel with yourself, you write poetry.
Al-Hakimi has not quarrelled with the world, to the best of my knowledge, i.e. not quarrelled publicly or violently; at any rate, there is no record of his quarrel with himself. He seems to be very much at peace with himself and with his world. Nevertheless ,he is a poet , in spite of Yeats' obiter dictum. Just to show, perhaps , that every poet worth his name is a law unto himself. And this of course, empowers him to have ' Lovers Quarrel' with the world, now and then, that no sooner starts than is mended.
Al-Hakimi is a poet of faith: faith in his God, faith in the land of his ancestors, its rugged stern-faced mountain ranges and deep reverence for Bilquis and her Basil. But he is at the same time aware that poems are not written with the faith however profound or principles however powerful. Poems are written with language –its sounds, its words and phrases and its coded meanings. Naturally and intuitively ,Al-Hakimi loves the sound patterns of his language ,its consonantal alliteration, vocalic assonances ,its mellifluous rhyme-sequences and its inimitable semantic patterns. This is what gives body to his faiths and ideas; this interanimation between his faiths and his loves constitutes his individual , unique contribution to the contemporary Arabic poetry .Al-Hakimi's poems are self-contained , richly meaningful structures of his feelings and emotions expressed through appropriate linguistic forms, gifts of his language
                                              Dr.  K. M. Tiwary
Taiz Province
Yemen
2009

Biography
Kapil Muni Tiwary was born in Nainijor village in the Bhojpur District of Bihar, India. He graduated from the University of Pennsylvania in 1966 with a dissertation on grammar and phonology, Comparative reconstruction of Indo-Iranian sounds: On the basis of 'An Avesta grammar in comparison with Sanskrit, part 1' by A. V. Williams Jackson.

Tiwary is a scholar of South Asian languages. He has published on such topics as echo words in Bhojpuri and has argued that echo-word constructions (in which "a word is repeated without its initial consonant, sometimes with a vowel change") can function as a kind of secret language. He coined the term "institutionalized weeping" in a study of weeping among Tamil women.

Books
Tiwary's first book, Panini's description of Sanskrit nominal compounds, was published by Janaki Prakashan, Patna in 1984. Another book, Language Deprivation and the socially disadvantaged: with special reference to Bihar, was published by Janaki Prakashan in 1994. This book was an outcome of a project of Indian Council of Social Science Research on which he was working in the eighties.

Editor
Tiwary was one of the editors of a bi-annual journal of social sciences and humanities, Explorations in 1987–88. His article, Caste-Conflict: A View from Bhojpur, was published in Volume I, No. I of Exploration in 1987.

He also edited an anthology of English prose, Aspects of English prose: an anthology, with R.C. Prasad in 1986.

Linguist
His articles and books on various branches of linguists have been of special interest for the scholars in India and abroad.

References

External links
 Kapil Muni Tiwary at Open Library
 Journal of Communication PracticesPrevious Issues
 Tiwary, K.M. (1978). "Tuneful Weeping: A Mode of Communication" Frontiers: A Journal of Women Studies.

People from Bhojpur district, India
20th-century Indian linguists
University of Pennsylvania alumni
Living people
Academic staff of Patna University
1932 births
Scholars from Bihar